The Jaiminiya Upanishad Brahmana (JUB) or the Talavakara Upanishad Brahmana is a Vedic text associated with the Jaiminiya or the Talavakara shakha of the Samaveda. It is considered as an Aranyaka. A part of this text forms the Kena Upanishad. Together with the Bṛhadāraṇyaka and Chāndogya Upanishads, it dates to the Brahmana period of Vedic Sanskrit, likely predating the 6th century BCE. This first printed edition of this text, edited by Hanns Oertel along with its translation into English by him was published in the Journal of the American Oriental Society in 1896.

It is not to be confused with the Jaiminiya Brahmana (JB), the actual Brahmana text of the Jaiminiya shakha of the Samaveda.

See also
 Brahmana

References

External links
Sri Aurobindo, The Upanishads . Sri Aurobindo Ashram, Pondicherry. 1972.

Brahmanas
Upanishads